Mak Ka Lok (born 17 August 1965) is a Macanese race car driver.

Mak has raced in Touring Car Championships within Asia and drove the final two rounds of the 2011 World Touring Car Championship in a BMW 320si In 1995 he won the Macau Cup race for the Group A 1600 class and finished second in 2008 race in the CTM class.

Statistics

Motor racing record

Complete World Touring Car Championship results
(key) (Races in bold indicate pole position) (Races in italics indicate fastest lap)

References

 Profile from WTCC website

Living people
1965 births
Macau racing drivers
World Touring Car Championship drivers
Hong Kong emigrants to Macau

Chinese F4 Championship drivers